PSBT may refer to:

 Phase shaped binary transmission
 Power Sector Benefit Trust
 PsbT, a small chloroplast-encoded hydrophobic polypeptide
 Public Service Broadcasting Trust, India
 pyrosequence-based typing
 Partially signed Bitcoin transaction